The 1884 United States presidential election in West Virginia took place on November 4, 1884, as part of the 1884 United States presidential election. West Virginia voters chose six representatives, or electors, to the Electoral College, who voted for president and vice president.

West Virginia was won by Grover Cleveland, the 28th governor of New York, (D–New York), running with the former governor of Indiana Thomas A. Hendricks, with 50.94 percent of the popular vote, against Secretary of State James G. Blaine (R-Maine), running with Senator John A. Logan, with 47.75 percent of the vote.

The Prohibition Party chose John St. John, the former governor of Kansas, and former Maryland State Senator William Daniel as their presidential and vice-presidential candidates and received 0.71 percent of the vote. The Greenback and Anti-Monopoly Parties both chose major general and former governor of Massachusetts Benjamin Butler and Absolom M. West, an unseated Mississippi representative, received 0.60 percent of the vote.

This would prove the last time the Democratic Party won an absolute majority of West Virginia’s popular vote until 1932.

Results

Results by county

References 

West Virginia
1884
1884 West Virginia elections